"Narco" is a song by Dutch DJ/production duo Blasterjaxx and Australian DJ/producer Timmy Trumpet, released as a single in 2017. It is used as the walkout song of Edwin Díaz, the closer for the New York Mets of Major League Baseball. The song is also used as walk-up and home run music for William Contreras of the Milwaukee Brewers, whose usage of it has generated mild controversy.

Composition and recording 
"Narco" was written and recorded by Blasterjaxx and Timmy Trumpet. The first portions of what would become "Narco" were created by Blasterjaxx members Idir Makhlaf and Thom Jongkind, who sought to create a song that would be mainstay on the dance floor. The duo soon created a synthetic drum beat that would remain in the introduction of the finished song and wrote a melody to go on top of it that Jongkind likened to an "Arabian flute". The Dutch duo had been looking to collaborate with Timmy Trumpet and, when Timmy Trumpet had a day's break in the midst of his 2017 European tour, the three met and the duo played samples of the song. Timmy Trumpet suggested that the duo should remove the flute, and instead suggested that the song substitute a trumpet in place of the flute; he would later play and record the trumpet part that would replace the flute in the finished version of the song. The Blasterjaxx duo would later add the song's drop as well as a verse of rapping, though the duo did not listen to the verse's lyrics prior to the song's publication. The duo decided to title the track "Narco" after the crime drama television series Narcos.

The song was released as a single in late 2017.

Reception

Use by Edwin Díaz 

The song's popularity is associated with that of Edwin Díaz, the closer for the New York Mets. Díaz first used the song as his walkout song during 2018, when he played for the Seattle Mariners. After he was traded to the Mets, he briefly changed his walkout song to "No Hay Limite" by Miky Woodz, though  "Narco" retook its position as Díaz's walkout song beginning in 2020 after Díaz's poor performance throughout the latter portion of the 2019 season; the song began to increase in popularity among Mets fans throughout the 2020 MLB season. Christopher Powers of Golf Digest later described the song as having "a fire beat", while describing it as "hilarious" that "a guy known for catastrophically blowing saves had such great entrance music".  During the 2021 and 2022 MLB seasons, Díaz's performance would improve and, by 2022, the song had become a favorite among fans of the Mets. Matt Monohan, writing for Major League Baseball, said that the use of "Narco" as a Díaz's entrance song is one of "the best all time" among baseball entrance music. On August 30, 2022, Timmy Trumpet attended the Mets' game against the Los Angeles Dodgers and met Díaz. Timmy Trumpet described himself as "officially a Mets fan for life"; this was the first professional baseball game he ever attended. It was also announced that he would perform live if Díaz pitched that day. Díaz did not enter the game, a 4–3 Mets loss, but Timmy Trumpet promised to come back the next day to play if Díaz pitched. On August 31, Díaz entered to pitch the ninth inning to live accompaniment by Timmy Trumpet and earned a save in a 2–1 win over the Dodgers.

Use by William Contreras 
The song is also used as walk-up music by William Contreras, a catcher for the Atlanta Braves, a division rival of the New York Mets. When asked about the fact that players on two rival teams were using "Narco" during an interview on MLB Network, Blasterjaxx's members declared Díaz the song's sole "official" user, with Makhlaf saying: "You can't have more, right? That's impossible. You have to choose your own song."

Charts 
As of August 16, 2022, the song was No. 18 on the Billboard Hot Dance/Electronic Songs chart, its then-peak position.

References

External links 
 
 

2017 songs
2017 singles
Timmy Trumpet songs
Blasterjaxx songs